North Jutland County is a former county (Danish: amt) in northern Denmark. It was located on the eastern half of Vendsyssel-Thy and the northernmost part of the Jutland peninsula. It was the largest county in Denmark, but with a relatively low population. The county seat was Aalborg, Denmark's fourth largest city. The county was abolished effective January 1, 2007, when it merged into North Denmark Region.

Municipalities (1970-2006)

See also
Vendsyssel
North Denmark Region
Northern Jutland

Former counties of Denmark (1970–2006)
North Jutland Region